The African Cup Winners' Cup was a football competition that started in 1975 and merged with the CAF Cup in 2004 to form the CAF Confederation Cup. It was a competition between the winning clubs of domestic cups in CAF-affiliated nations and was modelled after the UEFA Cup Winners' Cup.

History
The competition was founded at the beginning of 1975 by the Confederation of African Football, following the example of UEFA in Europe, the UEFA Cup Winners' Cup. For the first edition, fifteen teams took part registered and it was the Cameroonian club of Tonnerre Yaoundé who were the first winners, after defeating the Ivorians Stella Club d'Adjamé in the final.

Records and statistics

Finals

Performance by club

Performance by country

See also

References

External links
 African Cup Winners' Cup - rsssf.com

 
Defunct Confederation of African Football club competitions